The Chyolomdzha is a river in Magadan Oblast, Russia.

The Chyolomdzha is the longest tributary of the Taui (Kava) and flows across an uninhabited area, part of the Magadan Nature Reserve. 
The name of the river originated in the Even language.

Course 
The source of the Chyolomdzha is in the Upper Kolyma Highlands. The river heads in a roughly southern direction, flowing fast across mountainous terrain, then it turns to the southeast descending into a floodplain where it slows down and splits into multiple sleeves, while the channels form meanders. Finally the Chyolomdzha joins the left bank of the Taui in the wide Kava-Taui Plain,  from its mouth in the Sea of Okhotsk.

The river freezes yearly between early October and late May.

Fauna
Different species of salmonids live in the waters of the Chyolomdzha, including chum salmon, malma, coho salmon and kundzha, as well as grayling.

The banks of the river provide a habitat for the Blakiston's fish owl, an endangered species.

See also
List of rivers of Russia

References

External links
Floating Tours Down The Rivers of Magadan Region
Kolyma - Modern Guidebook to Magadan Oblast

Rivers of Magadan Oblast
Drainage basins of the Sea of Okhotsk